Djohari Kahar (11 November 1931 – 12 September 2021) was an Indonesian politician and lecturer. A member of Golkar, he served as Chairman of the West Sumatra Regional People's Representative Council and also represented West Sumatra on the People's Representative Council and the People's Consultative Assembly.

Biography
His father served as Chief of Police of Central Sumatra and became the first Governor of West Sumatra. He became a Member and Chairman of the Student Association of SMA Negeri Bukittinggi, serving from 1950 to 1952. He graduated from the Faculty of Law at Andalas University in 1962.

He worked as Chief Secretary of Shipyard projects at the Ministry of Energy and Mineral Resources from 1964 to 1966, and served as Secretary of the Ministry from 1966 to 1971. He was appointed to represent Golkar on the General Elections Commission from 1970 to 1971.

Kahar was elected to the West Sumatra Regional People's Representative Council in 1971 and served as Chairman from 1977 to 1987. From 1972 to 1977, he served as Deputy Chairman of KORPRI for West Sumatra. He served as Deputy Chairman of the KORPRI Board of Trustees from 1984 to 1987. He served on the People's Consultative Council from 1982 to 1987 and on the People's Representative Council from 1987 to 1992. He then retired from politics.

In August 2008, on Indonesia's 63rd Independence Day, Kahar was honored by Governor of West Sumatra Gamawan Fauzi alongside many other West Sumatran figures for his contributions to the development of the province.

Djohari Kahar died in Padang on 12 September 2021 at the age of 89.

References

1931 births
2021 deaths
People from Solok
Golkar politicians
Members of the People's Representative Council, 1982
Members of the People's Representative Council, 1987
Members of the West Sumatra Regional People's Representative Council
Members of Indonesian provincial assemblies